Kevin Gnatiko (born June 3, 1986, in Lomé) is a Togolese-born American soccer player who currently plays for Crystal Palace Baltimore in the USSF Second Division.

Career

College and Amateur
Born in Togo, Gnatiko moved with his parents to the United States while he was still a small child, settling in Montgomery Village, Maryland. He attended Watkins Mill High School and played college soccer at the University of Maryland Baltimore County, where he earning second-team All-America East honors as a junior.

During his college years he also played with the Cape Cod Crusaders in the USL Premier Development League.

Professional
Gnatiko turned professional in 2009, having been invited to the USL2 combine, and subsequently signed with Crystal Palace Baltimore. He made his pro debut on April 17, 2009, as a substitute in Baltimore's 0–0 season opening tie with the Pittsburgh Riverhounds.

External links
Crystal Palace Baltimore bio
UMBC bio

References

1986 births
Living people
American soccer players
USL Second Division players
Cape Cod Crusaders players
Crystal Palace Baltimore players
UMBC Retrievers men's soccer players
USL League Two players
People from Lomé
People from Montgomery Village, Maryland
Association football midfielders
21st-century Togolese people